Acacia sertiformis, commonly known as curly-leaved wattle, is a shrub belonging to the genus Acacia and the subgenus Phyllodineae native to north eastern Australia.

Description
It has sparsely to moderately hairy branchlets than can be coated in a white powder. The dull-grey green phyllodes are widely spread and rotated to the branchlet. The shrub flowers throughout the year.
The simple inflorescences have spherical flower-heads with a diameter of  containing 25 to 75 densely packed deep yellow flowers.

Taxonomy
The species was first formally described by the botanist Allan Cunningham in 1835 as part of William Jackson Hooker's work Botanical Magazine. It was reclassified as Racosperma sertiforme by Leslie Pedley in 2003 and then transferred back to genus Acacia in 2006.

Distribution
It is endemic only in a small area in south eastern Queensland from around Barakula, Wallangarra and Goombungee in the north and down to around Dubbo in New South Wales in the south where it is found in a variety of habitats growing in stony sandy-loamy soils as a part of open Eucalyptus or Callitris woodland communities.

See also
 List of Acacia species

References

sertiformis
Flora of Queensland
Flora of New South Wales
Plants described in 1835
Taxa named by Allan Cunningham (botanist)